Thijs van Hofweegen (born 30 November 1996) is a Dutch Paralympic swimmer with cerebral palsy. He is a silver medalist at the 2016 Summer Paralympics held in Rio de Janeiro, Brazil and a gold medalist in several events at the 2018 World Para Swimming European Championships held in Dublin, Ireland. He also won the bronze medal in the men's 50 metre freestyle S6 event at the 2022 World Para Swimming Championships held in Madeira.

Career 

He represented the Netherlands at the 2016 Summer Paralympics held in Rio de Janeiro, Brazil and he won the silver medal in the men's 400 metre freestyle S6 event. He also competed in the men's 50 metre freestyle S6 and men's 100 metre freestyle S6 where he respectively finished in 8th and 5th place in the final.

At the 2016 IPC Swimming European Championships held in Funchal, Madeira, he won the silver medal in the men's 100m freestyle S6 event. He also won the bronze medals in the men's 400m freestyle S6 event and in the 100m backstroke S6 event.

At the 2018 World Para Swimming European Championships held in Dublin, Ireland, he won three gold medals: in the men's 50 metres freestyle S6 event, in the men's 100 metres freestyle S6 event, in the men's 400 metres freestyle S6 event. He also won the bronze medal in the 4 x 100 metres medley relay event.

In 2021, he represented the Netherlands at the 2020 Summer Paralympics held in Tokyo, Japan. He competed in the men's 100 metre backstroke S6 and men's 100 metre freestyle S6 events and in both events he advanced to compete in the final. He also finished in 5th place in the men's 4 × 100 metre medley relay 34pts event.

References

External links 
 

1996 births
Living people
Dutch male backstroke swimmers
Dutch male freestyle swimmers
S6-classified Paralympic swimmers
Paralympic swimmers of the Netherlands
Paralympic silver medalists for the Netherlands
Paralympic medalists in swimming
Swimmers at the 2016 Summer Paralympics
Swimmers at the 2020 Summer Paralympics
Medalists at the World Para Swimming Championships
Medalists at the World Para Swimming European Championships
Swimmers with cerebral palsy
Place of birth missing (living people)
Medalists at the 2016 Summer Paralympics
21st-century Dutch people